Dakhadayevsky District is an administrative and municipal district (raion), one of the forty-one in the Republic of Dagestan, Russia. It is located in the southern central part of the republic. Its administrative center is the rural locality (a selo) of Urkarakh. As of the 2010 Census, the total population of the district was 36,709, with the population of Urkarakh accounting for 12.0% of that number.

Administrative and municipal status
Within the framework of administrative divisions, Dakhadayevsky District is one of the forty-one in the Republic of Dagestan. It is divided into one settlement (an administrative division with the administrative center in the urban-type settlement (an inhabited locality) of Kubachi) and fifteen selsoviets, which comprise sixty-three rural localities. As a municipal division, the district is incorporated as Dakhadayevsky Municipal District. The settlement is incorporated as an urban settlement, and the fifteen selsoviets are incorporated as twenty-five rural settlements within the municipal district. The selo of Urkarakh serves as the administrative center of both the administrative and municipal district.

References

Notes

Sources

Districts of Dagestan
